The 2006–07 Chicago Blackhawks season was the 81st season for the National Hockey League franchise that was established on September 25, 1926.

Regular season

The Blackhawks struggled on the power play, finishing 30th overall in power-play goals scored (43) and power-play percentage (11.81%).

Season standings

Final regular season standings for the 2006–07 NHL season.

Schedule and results

October

November

December

January

February

March

April

Green background indicates win.     
Red background indicates regulation loss.   
White background indicates overtime/shootout loss.

Player stats

Transactions

Trades

Free agents acquired

Free agents lost

Claimed off waivers

Lost on waivers

Draft picks
Chicago's picks at the 2006 NHL Entry Draft in Vancouver, British Columbia.

External links
Official site of the Chicago Blackhawks

See also
2006–07 NHL season

References

Game log: Chicago Blackhawks game log on espn.com
Team standings: NHL standings on espn.com
Player stats: Chicago Blackhawks 2006–07 reg. season stats on espn.com
Draft picks: 2006 NHL Entry Draft

Chic
Chic
Chicago Blackhawks seasons
Chicago Blackhawks
Chicago Blackhawks